
Gmina Nowa Sól is a rural gmina (administrative district) in Nowa Sól County, Lubusz Voivodeship, in western Poland. Its seat is the town of Nowa Sól, although the town is not part of the territory of the gmina.

Villages
Gmina Nowa Sól contains the villages and settlements of Buczków, Chełmek, Ciepielów, Dąbrowno, Drogoniów, Jeziorna, Jodłów, Józefów, Kiełcz, Lelechów, Lipiny, Lubięcin, Lubieszów, Nowe Żabno, Odra, Okopiec, Porębów, Przyborów, Radosławice, Rudno, Stany, Stara Wieś, Stary Staw, Stawy and Wrociszów.

Neighbouring gminas
Gmina Nowa Sól is bordered by the town of Nowa Sól and by the gminas of Bojadła, Bytom Odrzański, Kolsko, Kożuchów, Nowe Miasteczko, Otyń, Siedlisko and Sława.

References

Nowa Sol
Nowa Sól County